Richard Baffour (born April 1990) is a Ghanaian footballer who plays as a centre-back for  club Bourj.

Career
Starting his career at Bechem United, Baffour signed for Ismaily in Egypt in January 2017. On 26 September 2019, he joined Iraqi Premier League side Al-Quwa Al-Jawiya. Following an experience in Saudi Arabia at Al-Ansar, Bafour moved to Bourj in the Lebanese Premier League on 25 July 2022.

Style of Play
He is considered as a scoring defender as he scored and participated in several goals for his team Bourj.

References

External links
 
 
 

1990 births
Living people
Ghanaian footballers
Association football central defenders
Bechem United FC players
Ismaily SC players
Al-Quwa Al-Jawiya players
Al-Ansar FC (Medina) players
El Qanah FC players
Bourj FC players
Ghana Premier League players
Egyptian Premier League players
Saudi First Division League players
Lebanese Premier League players
Ghanaian expatriate footballers
Ghanaian expatriate sportspeople in Egypt
Ghanaian expatriate sportspeople in Saudi Arabia
Ghanaian expatriate sportspeople in Iraq
Ghanaian expatriate sportspeople in Lebanon
Expatriate footballers in Egypt
Expatriate footballers in Iraq
Expatriate footballers in Saudi Arabia
Expatriate footballers in Lebanon